Leon Pinsker (Yehudah Leib Pinsker; , Lev Semyonovich Pinsker; 1821–1891) was a physician, and Zionist activist.   

Earlier in life he had originally supported the cultural assimilation of Jews in the Russian Empire. He was himself born in the town of Tomaszów Lubelski in the southeastern border region of the Kingdom of Poland, and educated in Odessa, where he studied law but was unable to practice because of restrictions on occupations available to Jews. 

He was a supporter of equal rights under the law for Jews, but Pinsker's optimism was curtailed after the Odessa Pogroms. It was these events, first in 1871, and then in 1881, with greater intensity and lasting several years, after which Pinsker became active in the Hibbat Zion, a Zionist organization founded in 1881, in response to these pogroms. He was the founder and leader of the Hovevei Zion, also known as Hibbat Zion (Lovers of Zion) movement.

Political disagreements between religious and secular factions of the Odessa Committee, and Ottoman restriction on Jewish emigration, prevented Pinsker from resettling, and he died in Odessa in 1891. His remains were later brought to Jerusalem in 1934.

Biography
Leon (Yehudah Leib) Pinsker inherited a strong sense of Jewish identity from his father, Simchah Pinsker, a Hebrew language writer, scholar and teacher. Leon attended his father's private school in Odessa and was one of the first Jews to attend Odessa University, where he studied law. Later he realized that, being a Jew, he had no chance of becoming a lawyer due to strict quotas on Jewish professionals and chose the career of a physician.

Jewish and Zionist activism

Pinsker believed that the Jewish problem could be resolved if the Jews attained equal rights. In his early years, Pinsker favored the assimilation path and was one of the founders of a Russian language Jewish weekly (see also: Haskala).

The Odessa pogrom of 1871 moved Pinsker to become an active public figure. In 1881, a bigger wave of anti-Jewish hostilities, many state-sponsored, swept southern Russia and continued until 1884. Then Pinsker's views changed radically, and he no longer believed that mere humanism and Enlightenment would defeat antisemitism. In 1884, he organized an international conference of Hibbat Zion in Katowice (Upper Silesia, then part of the Kingdom of Prussia).

His visit to Western Europe led to his famous pamphlet Auto-Emancipation, subtitled Mahnruf an seine Stammgenossen, von einem russischen Juden (Warning to His Fellow People, from a Russian Jew), which he published anonymously in German on 1 January 1882, and in which he urged the Jewish people to strive for independence and national consciousness. The book raised strong responses, both for and against.

As a professional physician, Pinsker preferred the medical term "Judeophobia" to the recently introduced "antisemitism". Pinsker knew that a combination of mutually exclusive assertions is a characteristic of a psychological disorder and was convinced that pathological, irrational phobia may explain this millennia-old hatred: 
: "... to the living the Jew is a corpse, to the native a foreigner, to the homesteader a vagrant, to the proprietary a beggar, to the poor an exploiter and a millionaire, to the patriot a man without a country, for all a hated rival."His analysis of the roots of this ancient hatred led him to call for the establishment of a Jewish National Homeland, either in Palestine or elsewhere.  Eventually Pinsker came to agree with Moses Lilienblum that hatred of Jews was rooted in the fact that they were foreigners everywhere except their original homeland, the Land of Israel. He became one of the founders and a chairman of the Hovevei Zion movement, with the backing of Baron Edmond James de Rothschild.

Zionist agricultural settlement
In 1890, the Russian authorities approved the establishment of the Society for the Support of Jewish Farmers and Artisans in Syria and Palestine, dedicated to the practical aspects of establishing Jewish agricultural colonies there. Pinsker headed this charity organization, known as the Odessa Committee. Disagreements between various Jewish religious and secular factions, an internal movement crisis and the ban by the Ottoman Empire on Jewish immigration in the 1890s caused Pinsker to doubt whether Eretz Israel would ever become the solution.

Death and legacy
Pinsker died in Odessa in 1891. His remains were brought to Jerusalem in 1934 and reburied in Nicanor's Cave next to Mount Scopus.   Moshav Nahalat Yehuda, now a neighborhood in Rishon LeZion, is named after him, as well as a street in Tel Aviv and several other locales in Israel.

References

External links

 Resources and articles by Pinsker WZO

1821 births
1891 deaths
People from Tomaszów Lubelski
People from Tomaszów Lubelski County
19th-century Polish physicians
19th-century Polish Jews
Polish Zionists
Hovevei Zion